The Prior of May then Prior of Pittenweem (later Commendator of Pittenweem) was the religious superior of the Benedictine monks of Isle of May Priory, which later moved to the mainland became called Pittenweem Priory. The priory was originally based on the Isle of May, but was moved by 1318 to its nearby mainland site of Pittenweem, Fife, passing from the overlordship of Reading Abbey (Benedictine) to St Andrews Cathedral Priory (Augustinian). The following is a list of priors and commendators:


List of priors
 Achard, 1141x1150
 Robert, 1161 x 1162-1165 x 1166
 William, 1166x1171
 Hugh de Mortimer, 1198–1205
 John, 1206–1215
 Richard, 1221–1222
 Radulf, 1233
 John, 1248-1251
 William, 1251 x 1260
 Hugh, 1260–1269
 William de Gloucester, 1269–1270
 Thomas de Houburn, x 1306
 Jordan, 1309
 Martin, 1313–1318
 Adam de Pilmor, 1345
 Robert de Anderston, c. 1380
 Robert de Leuchars, 1405
 William Nory, 1402–1408; 1409-1419 x 1421
 James de Haldeston, 1407-1418
 John Litstar, 1418
 Thomas de Camera (Chalmers), 1419 x 1421-1447
 William Stury, 1421
 James Kennedy, 1447-1465
 Walter Monypenny, 1465-1467
 John Woodman, 1465-1477
 Patrick Graham, 1466-1478
 Walter Davidson, 1477–1479, 1489
 Thomas Kymner, 1486
 William Scheves, 1487-1497

List of commendators
 Andrew Forman, 1495-1515 x 1521
 Robert Forman, 1516–1526
 John Roul, 1525–1553
 Adam Blackadder, 1531
 John de Moncreif, 1550–1551
 James Stewart, 1550-1567
 Sir James Balfour of Pittendreich, 1567–1573
 James Haliburton, 1575–1583
 William Stewart of Houston, 1583-1603 x 1605

See also
 Isle of May Priory
 Pittenweem Priory
 Adrian of May

Notes

Bibliography
 Cowan, Ian B. & Easson, David E., Medieval Religious Houses: Scotland With an Appendix on the Houses in the Isle of Man, Second edition, (London, 1976), pp. 94–5
 Watt, D. E. R. & Shead, N .F. (eds.), The Heads of Religious Houses in Scotland from the 12th to the 16th Centuries, The Scottish Records Society, New Series, Volume 24, (Edinburgh, 2001), pp. 143–9

May
May
May